WGVU-FM is an NPR member station serving Grand Rapids, Michigan.  Owned by Grand Valley State University, it is simulcast in West Michigan.  The main broadcast frequency is 88.5 MHz, which is licensed to Allendale, the Grand Rapids suburb that is home to Grand Valley State's main campus.  It is simulcast on WGVS-FM 95.3 MHz, which is licensed to Whitehall and serves Muskegon.  The format is Talk radio from NPR, along with jazz.

WGVU-FM began broadcasting on July 17, 1983, as WGVC-FM, owned by what was then Grand Valley State College.  The station had originally operated (1974-1982) as student-run WSRX, with an alternative rock format. It was the first locally-focused NPR station in Grand Rapids.  It was West Michigan's fourth full NPR member, joining WVGR, a repeater of WUOM-FM in Ann Arbor (now known as Michigan Radio), WMUK in Kalamazoo, and WBLV in Muskegon.

95.3 FM in Whitehall began as Top 40 station WLRQ ("Super Q") in the late 1970s.  In the mid-1980s, the station bore the WRNF ("We're Rock Ninety Five") calls while continuing with a Top 40 format.  By the mid-1990s, 95.3 FM had the WKBZ-FM calls and was airing an urban contemporary format as "Power 95.3". Station owners Robert Jewell and Daniel Thill donated WKBZ-FM, along with WKBZ (850 AM), to Grand Valley in 1995, but the following year the stations were sold to WLC Broadcasting, and it was not until November 1998 that WLC returned the stations to Grand Valley and the university began using them as simulcasts of WGVU-AM/FM.

WGVU-FM 88.5 broadcasts in HD Radio and operates two side channels.   and WGVU-HD3 is all jazz.  Additionally the station's audio simulcasts on the digital subchannels of WGVU/WGVK-TV on channel 35.4/52.4 via the secondary audio program of that station (WGVU/WGVS is on the main audio channel), which features scrolling television schedules along with visual song/artist information for the radio audio.

WGVU-FM was the 2011 Michigan Association of Broadcasters Public Radio Station of the year among stations with a $2 million plus budget.  This ended the winning streak of Michigan Radio, with which WGVU-FM competes.

Sources
 WGVU-FM History, Michiguide.com
 WGVS-FM History, Michiguide.com

External links

GVU-FM
Jazz radio stations in the United States
Grand Valley State University
Allendale, Michigan
NPR member stations
Radio stations established in 1983